Paralemnalia is a genus of corals belonging to the family Nephtheidae.

The species of this genus are found in Africa, Malesia and Australia.

Species:

Paralemnalia clavata 
Paralemnalia digitiformis 
Paralemnalia eburnea 
Paralemnalia flabella 
Paralemnalia pichoni 
Paralemnalia thyrsoides

References

Nephtheidae
Octocorallia genera